Guanacaste Day is a Costa Rican holiday celebrating Costa Rica's annexation of the Guanacaste province in 1824. It is celebrated on July 25th.

History
Also known as Nicoya´s annexation to Costa Rica in 1824.

The land had three major cities: Nicoya, Santa Cruz, and Liberia. After a few negotiations in open meetings, the three cities decided to call a referendum, which took place in Nicoya.

It was a divided decision, with Nicoya and Santa Cruz voting yes and Liberia voting no. So the annexation won.

The Central American Federal Republic passed the law and signed it on July 25, 1824, allowing the Guanacaste province to become part of Costa Rican territory.

References

 Guanacaste Day: Celebrating the Annexation of Guanacaste in Costa Rica

July observances